Boynik is a village in Krumovgrad Municipality, Kardzhali Province, southern Bulgaria.

Boynik Point in Antarctica is named after the village.

References

Villages in Kardzhali Province